Zuzana Hájková (born 15 January 1963) is a Czech basketball player. She competed in the women's tournament at the 1988 Summer Olympics.

References

1963 births
Living people
Czech women's basketball players
Olympic basketball players of Czechoslovakia
Basketball players at the 1988 Summer Olympics
Sportspeople from Prague